Millfield is a suburb and electoral ward of the City of Sunderland, in Tyne and Wear, England. Most of the buildings in the area were built after the Victorian Era and are mostly built up of large terraced houses built for working-class people of the 20th century. When first built Millfield was located near the heart of Sunderland City Centre, but now has expanded.  It now links Pallion with the City Centre.

Millfield like Pallion is built very near the bank of the River Wear but then extends to Chester Road (The largest road in Sunderland & Washington).

Also located in Millfeild is an Aldi Supermarket and right next to the supermarket is the Millfield Metro station.

Millfield was part of the Sunderland South parliamentary constituency for elections to the House of Commons of the United Kingdom. Millfield is now part of Sunderland Central.

References

City of Sunderland suburbs
Sunderland